Bullockia maldonadoi is a species of catfish (order Siluriformes) of the family Trichomycteridae, and the only species of the genus Bullockia. This fish grows to about 7 centimetres (2.8 in) and originates from Chile.

References

Trichomycteridae
Taxa named by Carl H. Eigenmann
Freshwater fish of Chile
Fish described in 1928
Endemic fauna of Chile